Statonia was an ancient Etruscan city whose location is unknown and disputed.

Directly cite by George Dennis, The Cities and Cemeteries of Etruria vol I pag. 467 ss. Chapter XXIV STATONIA:

References

Sources
 George Dennis, The Cities and Cemeteries of Etruria vol I pag. 467 ss. Chapter XXIV STATONIA

External links
 

Etruscan cities
History of Tuscany
Former populated places in Italy
Archaeological sites in Tuscany
Populated places established in the 7th century BC
7th-century BC establishments in Italy